House of Pain, subtitled Fine Malt Lyrics, is the debut album of American hip hop group House of Pain, released on July 21, 1992 through Tommy Boy Records. The picture on the album cover was taken at 820 South Fairfax Avenue in Los Angeles.

Reception
Rolling Stone (10/29/92, p. 70) – 3.5 Stars – Good Plus – "With a groovy swagger, this collection of hard-core hip-hop tracks offers many moments of technicolor snap and crackle, and also titled House of Pain."
Q magazine (12/92, p. 124) – 3 Stars – Good – "...their music is of the dense, hard-hitting school of hip hop...the group have absorbed black rap's musical lessons and create a satisfying platform for their above average deliveries..."
The Source (9/92, p. 57) – 3.5 Stars – Good Plus – "...a very solid and at times exceptional album...imagine if Licensed to Ill wasn't an upper middle class Jewish thing but rather a working class Irish thang...the atmosphere is like that of a cross between a frat party and a bar room brawl..."
NME (11/7/92, p. 34) – 6 – Good – "...contains some creative and accomplished rap music..."

Track listing 

Additional:

 DJ Lethal for tracks 1, 4, 6, 7, 8, 15 and 17
 DJ Muggs for tracks 1, 2, 3, 9, 10, 12, 13 and 15
 Ralph Tha Funky Mexican for tracks 13, 14 and 16
 Pete Rock for track 18
 Butch Vig for track 19

Personnel
House of Pain:
Danny Boy O'Connor – vocals
DJ Lethal – scratches, production
Everlast – vocals

Technical personnel:
DJ Muggs
Ralph tha Funky Mexican

Charts

Weekly charts

Year-end charts

Certifications

References

1992 debut albums
House of Pain albums
Tommy Boy Records albums
Albums produced by DJ Muggs
Albums produced by DJ Lethal
Albums produced by Pete Rock